The Women's National Basketball League (WNBL) is a professional women's basketball league in the Philippines.

It is organized by the National Basketball League (NBL) which also maintains a men's league.

History
The National Basketball League (NBL) which maintains a men's league decided to organize a women's league as well to support the program of the Samahang Basketbol ng Pilipinas, the Philippines' national governing body for basketball.

The WNBL inaugural season began on April 7, 2019, and featured seven teams: Philippine Navy, Philippine Air Force, Taguig Lady Generals, Pampanga Delta Amazons, Cleon and Clyde Lady Snipers, Laguna Lady Pistons & Paranaque Lady Aces. Air Force won the inaugural title. The WNBL planned to hold its second season in 2020 but such move was cancelled due to the COVID-19 pandemic.

On August 26, 2020, the Games and Amusements Board accepted the NBL and WNBL's application to become professional leagues. The first WNBL draft was held on February 13, 2021.

The first professional season of the WNBL began on July 18, 2021.

Also in 2021, WNBL launched their own 3x3 Tournament.

Teams

Current teams

Former teams
Cleon and Clyde Lady Snipers
Glutagence Glow Boosters
Laguna Lady Pistons
Pacific Water Queens
Pampanga Delta Amazons
Parañaque Lady Aces

List of champions

References

Basketball leagues in the Philippines
Sports leagues established in 2019
2019 establishments in the Philippines
Women's basketball leagues in the Philippines
Women's basketball leagues in Asia
Professional sports leagues in the Philippines